C86 is the NME cassette released in 1986.

C86, C-86, or variation, may also refer to:

 Indie pop, the subgenre the cassette is associated with
 Ruy Lopez, Worrall Attack (Spanish Game) opening in the Encyclopaedia of Chess Openings
 Contracts of Employment (Indigenous Workers) Convention, 1947 (shelved) code
 Freeport/Dornink Airport (FAA LID: C86) in Freeport, Illinois, USA; see List of airports in Illinois
 a Manx's Aztec native mode 8086 MS-DOS cross compiler
 C86, a Draft for Standard C programming language released in 1986 for ANSI C
 Caldwell 86 (NGC 6397), a globular cluster in the constellation Ara
 , Mexican Navy ship, Auk-class minesweeper originating in WWII
 C-86 Forwarder, a 1932 military aircraft
 86th Comiket

See also

 
 
 86 (disambiguation)
 C (disambiguation)